Air Vice Marshal (Retd.) Mohammad Rafiqul Islam (born 2 February 1952) was a former Chief of Bangladesh Air Force. He was the Chief of Bangladesh Air Force from 4 June 2001 to 8 April 2002. He later joined Bangladesh Awami League and became a member of parliament of 9th parliament election in 2008 representing Chandpur-2 constituency.

Career
He was the chief of Bangladesh Air Force from 4 June 2001 to 8 April 2002.

References

 

Bangladesh Air Force air marshals
Living people
Chiefs of Air Staff (Bangladesh)
1952 births